I'm in a Rock 'n' Roll Band! is a documentary television series broadcast on BBC Two, narrated by Mark Radcliffe and first broadcast from 1 May to 5 June 2010. The series charts the history of rock music, with the first five episodes focusing on different members of a typical band, such as the singer or the guitarist. The final episode is special live episode, featuring "industry experts discuss their favourite musicians before creating the ultimate fantasy band." This will also feature the result of a public vote, which will ask viewers who they think are the greatest rock bands and band members.

At the end of the series, Led Zeppelin were named the best ever band, while the make-up of the Ultimate Fantasy Band was announced as Freddie Mercury, Jimi Hendrix, John Bonham and Flea.

Polls
Throughout the course of the series, a series of polls are being set up for people to vote for who they think is the greatest rock band and the best band members. The long-list was decided by a selection of industry experts. A new list is put up after each episode. These experts were:

Best Band
The nominations for the best rock band are:

The Beatles
The Clash
The Jimi Hendrix Experience
Joy Division
Led Zeppelin (Winner)
Nirvana
Queen
Radiohead
The Rolling Stones
The Smiths

Singers
The nominations for the best singer are:

Bono – U2
Kurt Cobain – Nirvana
Jarvis Cocker – Pulp
Debbie Harry – Blondie
Mick Jagger – The Rolling Stones
John Lydon/Johnny Rotten – The Sex Pistols and Public Image Ltd.
Freddie Mercury – Queen (Winner)
Morrissey – The Smiths
Robert Plant – Led Zeppelin
Iggy Pop – The Stooges

Guitarist
The nominations for the best guitarist are:

Jeff Beck – The Yardbirds
Matthew Bellamy – Muse
Eric Clapton – Cream
Graham Coxon – Blur
Jimi Hendrix – The Jimi Hendrix Experience (Winner)
Johnny Marr – The Smiths
Jimmy Page – Led Zeppelin
Slash – Guns N' Roses
Pete Townshend – The Who
Jack White – The White Stripes

Drummers
The nominations for the best drummer are:

Ginger Baker – Cream and Blind Faith
John Bonham – Led Zeppelin (Winner)
Phil Collins – Genesis
Stewart Copeland – The Police
Dave Grohl – Nirvana
Mitch Mitchell – The Jimi Hendrix Experience
Keith Moon – The Who
Ringo Starr – The Beatles
Lars Ulrich – Metallica
Charlie Watts – The Rolling Stones

Bassist
The nominations for the best bassist are:

John Entwistle – The Who
Flea – Red Hot Chili Peppers (Winner)
Peter Hook – Joy Division and New Order
Alex James – Blur
John Paul Jones – Led Zeppelin
Lemmy – Motörhead
Gary "Mani" Mounfield – The Stone Roses and Primal Scream
Paul McCartney – The Beatles and Wings
Paul Simonon – The Clash
Tina Weymouth – Talking Heads

Live final
From the long lists for best band, singer, guitarist and drummer, a shortlist of three nominations each went forward for discussion in the live final. The short lists were as follows:

Band
The Beatles
Led Zeppelin
Queen

Singer
Kurt Cobain – Nirvana
Freddie Mercury – Queen
Robert Plant – Led Zeppelin

Guitarist
Jimi Hendrix – The Jimi Hendrix Experience
Jimmy Page – Led Zeppelin
Slash – Guns N' Roses

Drummer
John Bonham – Led Zeppelin
Dave Grohl – Nirvana
Keith Moon – The Who

The winners of the best band, drummer, singer and guitarist were decided by phone voting during the live final. The winner of the best bassist was decided by online voting. At the end of the live final, all the results were announced, as follows:

Best Band
Led Zeppelin

Ultimate Fantasy Band
Singer – Freddie Mercury
Guitarist – Jimi Hendrix
Drummer – John Bonham
Bass – Flea

References

External links
 

2010 British television series debuts
2010 British television series endings
2010s British music television series
BBC high definition shows
BBC television documentaries
2010s British television miniseries
English-language television shows